Gerald Rosenfeld is an American businessman, academic, and investment banker.  He is well known as the former Head of Investment Banking of Lazard and as the former CEO of Rothschild North-America from 2000 to 2007.  He is currently an Adjunct Professor of Finance at New York University Stern School of Business, teaching in their Executive Education Open Enrollment program, Integrated Law and Business Financial Risk Management. Until February 2011, Rosenfeld continued to work at Rothschild in the capacity of senior advisor. In 2011, he returned to Lazard as a senior executive.

References

External links
 Profile at NYU.edu
 NYU Stern Executive Education
 Integrated Law and Business Financial Risk Management

American chief executives of financial services companies
American investment bankers
Jewish American academics
New York University faculty
Living people
N M Rothschild & Sons people
Year of birth missing (living people)
Charles H. Revson Foundation